Yahtse Glacier is a 40-mile-long (64 km) glacier in the U.S. state of Alaska. It begins on the southeast slope of Mount Miller and trends southeast along the north border of Guyot Glacier to Icy Bay, just east of Guyot Hills and 70 miles (113 km) northwest of Yakutat. The western extent is an icefield. The name derives from the Yahtse River and was adopted after the retreat of Guyot Glacier resulted in a separate branch.

See also
 List of glaciers

References

Glaciers of Alaska
Glaciers of Yakutat City and Borough, Alaska